Alphonse Métérié (17 September 1887 – 30 April 1967) was a 20th-century French poet who was awarded twice a prize by the Académie française; the Prix Georges Dupau in 1951 and the Prix Auguste Capdeville in 1957 for all his work.

Works 
1910: Carnet, 1910
1918: Le Poilu et la Princesse
1922: Le Livre des sœurs
1923: Le Cahier noir
1929: Nocturnes
1929: Petit Maroc
1934: Cophetuesques
1934: Petit Maroc deux
1944: Les Cantiques de Frère Michel
1946: Vétiver
1951: Proella ou le Second Livre des sœurs
1957: Éphémères

Bibliography

External links 
 Alphonse Métérié on the site of the Académie française
 Poésies on Revue des Deux mondes (September 1951)

1887 births
1967 deaths
People from Amiens
20th-century French poets